Dāmodara Bhaṭṭa was a Sanskrit scholar and author of the , also called the , a text that deals with the use of yantras in the performance of magical rites. He lived in north India during the second half of the sixteenth century.

References

Indian Sanskrit scholars
Year of death unknown
Year of birth unknown
16th-century Indian linguists